xml:tm (XML-based Text Memory) is a standard for XML to allow ease of translation of XML documents.

xml:tm forms part of the Open Architecture for XML Authoring and Localization reference architecture.

External links

xml:tm page on the LISA  web site

Technical communication
XML-based standards
XML markup languages
Internationalization and localization